Pershing Square station is an underground rapid transit (known locally as a subway) station on the B Line and D Line of the Los Angeles Metro Rail system. The station also has a street-level stop for the northbound J Line of the Los Angeles Metro Busway system. The station is located under Hill Street between 4th and 5th Street. It is located in Downtown Los Angeles with one station entrance across the street from Pershing Square, after which the station is named, and the other is located near the historic Angels Flight funicular which provides access to the high-rise office buildings in the Bunker Hill neighborhood.

Service

Station layout

Hours and frequency

Connections 
In addition to the rail and busway services, Pershing Square station is a major hub for municipal bus lines. , the following connections are available:
 Angels Flight
 Foothill Transit: Silver Streak
 LADOT Commuter Express: *
 LADOT DASH: B, D
 Montebello Bus Lines: 40, 50, 90Express*
 Torrance Transit: 4X*
Note: * indicates commuter service that operates only during weekday rush hours.

Notable places nearby 
The station is within walking distance of the following notable places:
 Angels Landing – Two high-rise buildings planned on the site above the station
 Grand Central Market
 Historic Core/Broadway
 Jewelry District
 Richard J. Riordan Central Library
 Millennium Biltmore Hotel
 Pershing Square
 Title Guarantee and Trust Company Building
 U.S. Bank Tower
 Los Angeles Theatre Center (LATC)

Station artwork 

The station is decorated with a neon art piece by Stephen Antonakos. The work pays tribute to the first neon sign in the United States, which was hung in 1924 in the Pershing Square area.

References 

Los Angeles Metro Busway stations
Pershing Square Metro
D Line (Los Angeles Metro) stations
B Line (Los Angeles Metro) stations
J Line (Los Angeles Metro)
Railway stations in Los Angeles
Bus stations in Los Angeles
1993 establishments in California
Railway stations in the United States opened in 1993